Prêmio Brasil Olímpico (Brazil Olympic Prize) is the name given to the highest recognition that a Brazilian athlete can receive nationally.

History and configuration
The award was created in 1999 by the Brazilian Olympic Committee (BOC), who wanted to have a form of maximum recognition that could be bestowed upon the Brazilian athletes that were considered to have been the best in the country.

The first installment of the award was held in São Paulo, but every other ceremony thereafter has been held in Rio de Janeiro. A strike of the Theatro Municipal employees in 2016 postponed the ceremony until March 29, 2017.

In order to be eligible, an athlete must be affiliated to a sport's Confederation whose sport is part of the Olympic Program. The athlete is then nominated by his or her Confederation for a vote that will determine the best athlete in the country for each sport — some Confederations have nominated only one athlete at times, which results in the need for only one vote in order for the athlete to be chosen as the best in the country.

The winners of each sport's election integrate the longlist for the highest award to be granted: the Athlete of the Year award. From the longlist, three finalists (or nominees) are selected, with the winner announced only at the Award Ceremony, which takes place in the first half of December. It is also possible that an athlete that may not have won in his or her sport (which serves as a longlist for the Athlete of the Year award), still be included in the shortlist, if said athlete is the winner of the previous year award. This was done in 2005, when female gymnast Daiane dos Santos, although not having won in her sport's category, was included in the shortlist for the female award as the winner of the 2004 award — this resulted in the unusual circumstance of having two athletes from the same sport running for the same award, since gymnast Laís Souza was also nominated for the female Athlete of the Year award.

A noteworthy discrepancy is that, in the election for best athlete in each sport, men and women run together (there is only one "best athlete" in each sport, man or woman), but for the nomination for Best Athlete of the Year, there are separate categories for male and female athletes. This has the effect of ensuring a variety of sports amidst the six athletes (between men and women) that run for the two awards, since no sport will have two nominees (one male and one female).

In the election, the candidates are voted on by two separate groups: a selected jury (chosen by the BOC) and the popular vote, both voting online. The results are then combined and the winner, chosen.

In addition, there is another award, which can be granted to both athletes and non-athletes: the Personalidade Olímpica (Olympic Personality) Award. This is granted to any public figure whose efforts were deemed to have helped advance sport in the country.

In 2004, for the first time, awards were given for the Best Paralympic Athlete of the Year (separately for men and women).

Best athlete of the year

Men

Women

Fan's Choice

References

External links
Official website (Portuguese)

Braz
Awards established in 1999
1999 establishments in Brazil
Sport in Brazil
Sports trophies and awards